The Heart Scarab of Hatnefer is a piece of funerary jewelry dating to the 15th century BC. Done in gold and serpentinite, the Heart scarab was intended to be interred with a person of importance. The piece is currently in the collection of the Metropolitan Museum of Art.

Description 
The work, dating to the Eighteenth Dynasty of Egypt, is intricately detailed; the scarab (a common symbol associated with the god Khepri) at the center of the work is carved from a single mottled grey-green serpentinite stone. This figure is mounted on a gold base, and is fastened to said base by more gold. A chapter from the Book of the Dead is inscribed on the object, indicating that the work was intended to be buried with Egyptian noblewoman Hatnefer. Specificity, the inscription invokes Spell 30 from Chapter A of the Book of the Dead, entreating the gods to not judge Hatnefer's heart in the afterlife.

As noted by the Metropolitan Museum of Art, Hatnefer's name was inscribed on the piece over another name, indicating that the scarab was originally not meant for her.

References 

15th century BC in Egypt
15th-century BC works
Jewellery of the Metropolitan Museum of Art
Scarabs (artifacts)
Gold objects